Artem Aleksandrovich Kontsevoy (born 26 August 1999) is a Belarusian professional footballer who plays as a midfielder for BATE Borisov.

International career
He made his debut for the Belarus national football team on 2 September 2021 in a World Cup qualifier against the Czech Republic, a 0–1 away loss. He substituted Max Ebong in the 89th minute.

International goal
Scores and results list Belarus' goal tally first.

References

External links 
 
 

1999 births
Living people
People from Mogilev
Sportspeople from Mogilev Region
Belarusian footballers
Belarus under-21 international footballers
Belarus international footballers
Association football midfielders
Belarusian expatriate footballers
Expatriate footballers in Hungary
Expatriate footballers in the Czech Republic
FC Dnepr Mogilev players
FC Dnyapro Mogilev players
Mezőkövesdi SE footballers
FC Rukh Brest players
FC Baník Ostrava players
FC Dinamo Minsk players
FC BATE Borisov players